A Mysterious World is 2011 Argentine drama film directed by Rodrigo Moreno. The film premiered In Competition at the 61st Berlin International Film Festival and was nominated for the Golden Bear.

Cast
 Esteban Bigliardi as Boris

References

External links
 

2011 films
2011 drama films
2010s Spanish-language films
Argentine drama films
2010s Argentine films